Jalan Cheeding (Selangor state route B60) is a major road in Selangor, Malaysia.

List of junctions

Roads in Selangor